Rodney Andrey Brown (born May 21, 1993, in Chappell Hill, Texas) is an American track and field athlete specializing in the discus throw. He competed at the 2015 World Championships in Beijing without recording a valid throw. Earlier he won the gold medal at the 2014 NACAC U23 Championships.

His personal best in the event is 66.00 metres set at the Mt. SAC Relays held in Norwalk, California in 2016.  He holds the Louisiana State University school record at 65.06 meters set at the Penn Relays in 2015.

Competition record

See also
 United States at the 2015 World Championships in Athletics

References

1993 births
Living people
American male discus throwers
People from Chappell Hill, Texas
World Athletics Championships athletes for the United States